Nalivan (also Romanized as Nalīvān; also known as Malivan) is a village in Oshnavieh-ye Shomali Rural District of the Central District of Oshnavieh County, West Azerbaijan province, Iran. At the 2006 National Census, its population was 878 in 145 households. The following census in 2011 counted 1,040 people in 234 households. The latest census in 2016 showed a population of 1,186 people in 302 households; it was the largest village in its rural district.

References 

Oshnavieh County

Populated places in West Azerbaijan Province

Populated places in Oshnavieh County